Levett is a surname of Anglo-Norman origin, deriving from [de] Livet, which is held particularly by families and individuals resident in England and British Commonwealth territories.

Origins

This surname comes from the village of Livet-en-Ouche, now Jonquerets-de-Livet, in Eure, Normandy. Here the de Livets were undertenants of the de Ferrers family, among the most powerful of William the Conqueror's Norman lords. The name Livet (first recorded as Lived in the 11th century), of Gaulish etymology, may mean a "place where yew-trees grow".

The first de Livet in England, Roger, appears in Domesday as a tenant of the Norman magnate Henry de Ferrers. de Livet held land in Leicestershire, and was, along with Ferrers, a benefactor of Tutbury Priory. By about 1270, when the Dering Roll was crafted to display the coats of arms of 324 of England's most powerful lords, the coat of arms of Robert Livet, Knight, was among them. Some Levetts were early knights and Crusaders; many members of both English and French families were Knights Hospitallers, and served as courtiers.

English Levetts

A Levett family settled in Derbyshire was extinct by the early sixteenth century. A family of the name resident in Sussex at Warbleton and Salehurst also held the manor of Firle until it passed from family control in 1440 due to the debts of Thomas Levett, whose bankruptcy also necessitated the loss of Catsfield, East Sussex. Sussex deeds indicate instances of 'Levetts' attached to place names, indicating possession by individuals and families of that name. In 1620, John Levett, of Sedlescombe, Sussex, was forced by financial hardship to sell his half-interest in Bodiam Castle, inherited family land and property across Sussex and Kent, including at Ewhurst, Salehurst, Battle, Sussex and Hawkhurst, Kent, to Sir Thomas Dyke, for £1000; this represented the end of these Levetts as prominent landowners.

Families of the name Levett (also Levet, Lyvet, Levytt, Livett, Delivett, Levete, Leavett, Leavitt, Lovett and others) would subsequently settle in Gloucestershire, Yorkshire, Worcestershire, Suffolk, Warwickshire, Wiltshire, Kent, Bedfordshire and Staffordshire.

By the mid twentieth century, only two prominent Levett families remained; that of Milford Hall, Staffordshire and that formerly of Wychnor Hall, Staffordshire (and Packington Hall). Milford Hall passed in the female line to the Haszard family, and Wychnor Park was sold by the Levetts to Lt-Col W. E. Harrison in 1913, this later becoming a country club.

The Levett-Scrivener family (descending from a daughter of the Milford Hall family) retains the ruin of Sibton Abbey, which they have made available to historical societies and researchers; the Levett-Prinseps (a branch of the Wychnor Park family) were unable to maintain Croxall Hall; it was sold in 1920 and the estate was broken up.

By 1871, although family tradition of a common ancestor of the Milford Hall and Wychnor Park Levett families was mentioned in the latter pedigree, the earliest listed ancestors of each family were, respectively, William Levett of Savernake, Wiltshire, page to King Charles I at the time of his death in 1649, and Theophilus Levett, who died 1746. Even the 1847 edition, produced at a time when Burke's publications were inclusive of vague, unproven 'family traditions' (a practice subsequently widely criticised), makes no mention of any earlier ancestors or Norman origin in either family's pedigree.

Individuals of the name of Levett (and its variants) appear in all social strata: John Levett, a guard on the London to Brighton coach, was convicted of petty theft and transported to Australia in the nineteenth century; English records reveal Levetts embroiled in bastardy cases or relegated to poorhouses. A Francis Levett was a factor living in Livorno, Italy, travelling back and forth to Constantinople for the Levant Company. He subsequently failed at British East Florida as a planter; his son Francis Jr. returned to America, where he became the first to grow Sea Island cotton.

A notable individual of the name was the unschooled Yorkshireman who, having worked as a Parisian waiter, then trained as an apothecary. Robert Levet returned to England, where he treated denizens of London's seedier neighbourhoods. Having married an apparent grifter and prostitute, Levet was taken in by the poet Samuel Johnson. While Samuel Johnson adopted one Levet as boarder, he was apologizing to another better-placed Levett who held the mortgage on Johnson's mother's home in Lichfield.

Levetts elsewhere

Today there are many Levetts (the spelling of the name varies) living outside England, including in South Africa, Australia, New Zealand, Canada, and Ireland.

In a few cases Levetts were forced by religious belief to flee England for the colonies. Among these were tailor John Leavitt and farmer Thomas Leavitt, early English Puritan immigrants to Massachusetts and New Hampshire, respectively, whose names first appear in seventeenth-century New England records as Levet or Levett.

People surnamed Levett
Individuals bearing the surname of Levett include:

Places named after Levett families and individuals

Hooton Levitt, South Yorkshire
Catsfield Levett, East Sussex, now simply Catsfield
Levitt Hagg, South Yorkshire
Fort Levett, Casco Bay, Maine
Levette Lake, British Columbia, Canada
Levitstown (initially Lyvetiston), County Kildare, Ireland
Leavitt, California
Leavittsburg, Ohio
Leavitt Island, Alaska North Slope
Leavittstown, now Effingham, New Hampshire
Leavitt's Hill, now Deerfield, New Hampshire
Leavitt Peak, California
Leavitt, Alberta, Canada
Levetts Fields, Lichfield, Staffordshire
Levetts Square, Lichfield, Staffordshire
Leavitt (crater), Moon
5383 Leavitt, asteroid, Solar System

Places associated with Levett families or individuals
These places are or were associated with Levett families or individuals:

In media

Levett was the name given by Alfred Hitchcock to the villain in his first film, The Pleasure Garden, a 1925 silent movie
Geoffrey Levett is the male lead character in Margery Allingham's novel, The Tiger in the Smoke (made into a 1956 British film of the same name)

See also
 Leavitt (surname)

References

Notes

Further reading
Printed sources
 Sons of the Conqueror: Descendants of Norman Ancestry, Leslie Pine, London, 1973
 The Origins of Some Anglo-Norman Families, Lewis C. Loyd, David C. Douglas, John Whitehead & Son Ltd., London, 1951
 The Normans, David C. Douglas, The Folio Society, London, 2002
 Regesta Regum Anglo Normannorum, 1066–1154, Henry William Davis, Robert J. Shotwell (eds.), 4 volumes, Clarendon Press, Oxford, 1913
 The Levetts of Staffordshire, Dyonese Levett Haszard, privately printed
 "The Fortunes of Some Gentry Families of Elizabethan Sussex," J. E. Mousley, The Economic History Review, April 1959, Vol. 11, pp. 467–482
 Prosopography of Persons Occurring in English Documents, 1066–1166, Volume 1, Katharine Keats-Rohan, Woodbridge, Suffolk, Boydell Press, 1999

Google Books
Seal of John Livet, Lord of Firle, Sussex, Lewes Castle Museum, Sussex Archaeological Collections, 1866
Purchase of Bodiam Castle by John Levett, Descriptive Catalogue of the Original Charters, Royal Grants, and Donations, Monastic Chartulary Constituting the Muniments of Battle Abbey, Founded by William the Conqueror, Thomas Thorpe, London, 1835
 Roger de Livet, ca. June/July 1171,  Court, Household, and Itinerary of King Henry II, Robert William Eyton, Great Britain, 1878 
Origins of the Levett name from Lewis Loyd, The Origins of Some Anglo-Norman Families
A Genealogical and Heraldic Dictionary of the Landed Gentry of Great Britain, Bernard Burke, 1863
Levett, Packington Hall, Mansions and Country Seats of Staffordshire and Warwickshire, Alfred Williams, Walter Henry Mallett, 1899
The Norman People and Their Existing Descendants in the British Dominions and the United States of America, Henry S. King & Co., 1874
Levet of Sussex, Le Neve's Pedigrees of the Knights Made by King Charles II, etc., Peter Le Neve, 1873
Johannes Lyvet, Hastings, Sussex, Summoned to meet at Westminster, 1417, King Henry V, Sussex Archaeological Collections, Sussex Archaeological Society, 1881
Coat of Arms, Levett of High Melton and Normanton, Yorkshire, impaling Barnby, St James' Church, High Melton
Levett of High Melton and Normanton, Yorkshire, New England Historic and Genealogical Register, Henry Fitz-Gilbert Waters, 1913
Thomas Levett-Prinsep, Derbyshire
Tomb Chests of Levetts, All Saints Church, Normanton, The Yorkshire Archaeological Journal, 1879
 Levett of Normanton, Yorkshire, Walks in Yorkshire; Wakefield and its Neighbourhood, William Stott Banks, 1871
Levett, The Genealogist's Guide, George William Marshall, 1893
Alumni Oxoniensis: The Members of the University of Oxford, 1500–1714
The Visitations of Sussex Made and Taken in the Years 1530, College of Arms, 1905
 John Levet (eventually Leavitt), Hingham, MA, 1661 deed from Native Americans, Suffolk Deeds, Suffolk County, Mass., 1894
 Moses Levet (eventually Leavitt), Exeter, NH, Minutes of Council and Assembly of New Hampshire, Calendar of State Papers, Colonial Series, Great Britain Public Record Office, 1621–1698, London
 Richard Levette, Burgess of Calais, A Descriptive Catalogue of Ancient Deeds in the Public Record Office, Great Britain Public Record Office, 1902
Robert Lyvet, Knight, Sussex, 1286, Calendar of Charters and Documents Relating to the Abbey of Robertsbridge, Baron Philip Sidney De L'Isle, 1873
Sir John Levett, chaplain to Ryther, The Will of Thomas Ryther of Ryther, Yorkshire, Esq., July 1, 1527, Testamenta Eboracensia, John Will Clay, 1884
 Order of King Edward I to his Irish Magnates, John de Lyvet, 1302, A Genealogical History of the Dormant, Abeyant, Forfeited and Extinct Peerages of the British Empire, Sir Bernard Burke, 1866
 Levet of Sussex, A Compendious History of Sussex, Mark Antony Lower, Lewes, Sussex, 1870
  Dictionnaire des fiefs, seigneuries, chatellenies, etc. de l'ancienne France, Paris, 1862 
History of de Livet family, Normandy, Dictionnaire de la noblesse contenant les généalogies, l'histoire & la chronologie des familles nobles de France, Francois Alexandre Aubert de La Chesnaye-Desbois, 1775

External links

Some variations of the name Levett
Portrait of Dr. Robert Levett of Lichfield, Staffordshire, d. 1782, Erasmus Darwin House, Lichfield District Council, Flickr.com
Levett of Sussex Coat of Arms, YeOldeSussexPages
Levett of High Melton and Normanton, Thurcroft web

Surnames
English-language surnames
French-language surnames
Surnames of Norman origin
People from Eure
Normans in Ireland
English people of French descent